RR Keshavamurthy (1913-2006) was an Indian violinist. RRK, as he was popularly known specialised in the seven-stringed violin. RRK was a student of Bidaram Krishnappa, the guru of the violinist Mysore T. Chowdiah. He was a said to be a legend of seven stringed violin. He influenced senior musicians like T. Rukmini, Bhuvaneshawaraih, M. S. Krishnaveni and Anoor Ramakrishna.

RRK trained a number of young musicians and is the author of a dozen books on music. He was known for his rigorous practice and discipline. Today's other performing students trained by RRK include Dr. Meenakshi Ravi, Dr. Jyotsna Srikanth,Yogendra R ,Vidwan. Mysore Sanjeev kumar - Violist and Violinist Nalina Mohan, Jyotsna Manjunath and Nikhil Joshi. RRK presented many papers on the subject of violin playing and violin fingering techniques. He had commanded a unique position in the field of carnatic music.

R. R. Keshavamurthy was addressed with the title Sangeeta Vidya Sagara more frequently than others. He received many other titles such as Sangeetha Kala Rathna and Nada Bheeshma Vidwan. He was not celebrated much during his lifetime for his unique temperament and was not known to be very sociable. He was known for his terse and tough expressions. Very rugged in his approach, he had accompanied many stalwarts during his time.

He authored many music books.

Awards
Veena Seshanna Memorial Award
Kanaka Purandara Prashasthi in 1993
Sangeet Natak Akademi Award

References

1913 births
2006 deaths
Indian violinists
20th-century violinists
20th-century Indian musicians
Recipients of the Sangeet Natak Akademi Award